Quadratus labii may refer to:

 Depressor labii inferioris muscle, also known by the Latin term quadratus labii inferioris
 Levator labii superioris, also known by the Latin term quadratus labii superioris